Lawyer is a surname and a masculine given name, and may refer to:

First name
 Lawyer Milloy (born 1973), American football player
 Lawyer Tillman (born 1966), American football player
 Hallalhotsoot or "Lawyer" (c. 1797–1876), a leader of the Niimíipu (Nez Perce) Native American tribe

Surname
 Abraham L. Lawyer (1792–1853), New York politician
 Thomas Lawyer (1785–1868), US Congressman from New York

See also
 Tracye Lawyer-Thomas (born 1977), American heptathlete

Surnames
English-language surnames